Daia Română is a commune located in the southeastern part of Alba County, Transylvania, Romania. It has a population of 2,773. It is composed of a single village, Daia Română.

The river Daia flows through the commune.

Daia Română borders Berghin commune to the north and northeast, Șpring commune to the east and southeast, Cut commune to the south, the city of Sebeș to the southwest, the city of Alba Iulia to the west, and Ciugud commune to the north.

References

Communes in Alba County
Localities in Transylvania